Alexander MacQueen may refer to:

 Alex Macqueen (born 1973), English actor
 Alexander MacQueen (cricketer) (born 1993), English cricketer

See also
 Alexander McQueen (1969–2010), British fashion designer and couturier
 Alexander McQueen (brand), a British luxury fashion house
 Alexander McQueen (footballer) (born 1995), Grenadan footballer